Mikhail Vladimirovich Mikhalkov (28 December 1922, Moscow – 5 September 2006, Moscow) was a Soviet intelligence officer and writer working under the pen names M. Andronov (М. Андронов) and M.  Lugovykh (М. Луговых). He was a younger brother of Soviet poet Sergey Mikhalkov.

Biography
Mikhail Mikhalkov was born to the Mikhalkov noble family that was relatively wealthy even under Soviet rule. In his childhood the family kept a German governess so he had a reasonable German-language skills. In 1940 he graduated from a School of NKVD Border Troops.

In September 1941 he served in the NKVD Special Section (counterintelligence; which later became SMERSH)  of the Southwestern Front under Mikhail Kirponos and was taken a POW after the collapse of Soviet defense of Kiev. Thrice he was put in German POW camps and thrice he managed to escape. Pretending to be an ethnic German from Ukraine, he managed to get a position as a kitchen hand in the 2nd SS Division Das Reich. He then escaped to Hungary, where he met a Swiss industrialist who offered him an employment. Mikhalkov worked in Switzerland, France, Belgium and Turkey but eventually managed to cross the front line in Latvia dressed in the uniform of a captain of 3rd SS Division Totenkopf he killed.

He was arrested by the Soviet military and because of the emotional stress could not speak Russian  but only German, still talking through interpreters he provided important information on the position of German troops as well as to convey that he is in fact a Soviet NKVD officer, brother of the author of the National Anthem of the Soviet Union, Sergei Mikhalkov. After the confirmation of his identity Mikhail Mikhalkov was sent to Moscow where he worked as a secret NKVD agent in Lubyanka prison. He used to be sent to a prison cell, befriended the inmates, then shared the obtained information with NKVD investigators. Soon Mikhalkov himself was arrested and sentenced as a German spy.

He was sentenced to three years of Gulag camps and five years of exile. Afterwards he was forbidden to live in Moscow. In 1953 after Joseph Stalin's death KGB proposed Mikhalkov to write a book (named In labyrinths of deadly risk  В лабиринтах смертельного риска) about his adventures during World War II. In 1956 he was rehabilitated, awarded an Order of Glory and allowed to live in Moscow. The book was translated into German and French and printed as a propaganda piece for foreign readers. The Russian original of the book was published only in 1991 with the onset of perestroika. An expanded version of the book was included into the Two brothers - two fates publication. His nephew Nikita Mikhalkov announced his intention to film a TV serial based on Mikhail's story.

After rehabilitation Mikhalkov worked in KGB offices, in the Political Department of Soviet Army and in the organization of World War II veterans. He also wrote children poetry, texts of songs and biographies.

Books

Published by Mikhail Mikhalkov 
Two lives (about World War II heroes P. Koshkarev and A. Romanov)
In labyrinths of deadly risk - autobiography
 Articles of D. S. Mirsky

Published posthumously 
Two brothers - two fates (together with Sergei Mikhalkov);
F. Plevako
Wolf Messing
Loves and Myths of Family Happiness
Fairytail Horse
Children stories in rhimes
History of Brest Museum
Front
Children Poetry

References

Further reading
 Mikhail Mikhalkov, Sergey Mikhalkov, Two brothers - two fates, 2005, 

Soviet poets
Soviet male writers
20th-century Russian male writers
Russian male poets
People convicted of spying for the Soviet Union
KGB officers
Writers from Moscow
1922 births
2006 deaths
Soviet prisoners of war
NKVD officers
Mikhalkov family